349th Squadron is a fighter squadron in the Air Component of the Belgian Armed Forces. The squadron traces its origins to No. 349 (Belgian) Squadron of the Royal Air Force, founded in 1942 as part of the Free Belgian forces during World War II. It was transferred to the re-established Belgian Air Force in 1946, together with 350th Squadron. Considered an "honorary" squadron, it retained its original name and numbering and has been flying under the Belgian flag ever since. Today it is part of the 10th Tactical Wing, operating the F-16 Fighting Falcon from Kleine Brogel airbase.

History

Royal Air Force (1942–46)
No 349 (Belgian) Squadron was formed as a Royal Air Force squadron by Belgian personnel at RAF Ikeja (near Lagos), Nigeria on 10 November 1942. The squadron was equipped with the Curtiss Tomahawk for local defence duties but the squadron did not become operational as such. The pilots were used for ferrying aircraft to the Middle East instead. The squadron was disbanded in May 1943 and the personnel transferred to the UK. On 5 June 1943, the Squadron was reformed at RAF Station Wittering, operating the Supermarine Spitfire V and became operational at RAF Digby in August 1943. The squadron moved to southern England to operate over France as bomber escorts and low-level sweeps. In early 1944, it began training as a fighter-bomber unit and then operated as such in occupied Europe. During the invasion of Normandy, it carried out beachhead patrols and were used as bomber escorts. In August 1944 the squadron moved to France, in the fighter-bomber role, and carried out armed reconnaissance behind enemy positions, attacking targets of opportunity (mainly vehicles). In February 1945, the squadron returned to England to convert to the Hawker Tempest. This did not go well: conversion ended in April, and the squadron reacquired Spitfire IXs, operating from the Netherlands. It moved to Belgium and was disbanded as an RAF-squadron on 24 October 1946 on transfer to the Belgian Air Force, keeping the number.
The last Belgian pilot to fly for the original 349th squadron during D-day, Joseph Moureau, died in 2020 at the age of 99. During the second world war a total of 521 Belgian officers served in the RAF, suffering 128 loses.

Aircraft operated during RAF service

Commanding officers

Belgian Air Force (1946 to present)

In 1946, the unit was integrated in the Belgian Air Force. From 1998, the unit was commanded by future Belgian astronaut Frank De Winne.

From 1957 to 1964, the squadron operated the Avro Canada CF-100 Canuck.

In 1999, the squadron participated in the NATO bombing of Yugoslavia. In 2004, it was the first squadron to be deployed to Siauliai airbase, Lithuania in the context of the Baltic Air Policing operation. In 2005 and 2008 it was deployed to Kabul as part of the ISAF mission in Afghanistan. In 2011, it was part of Operation Unified Protector during the Libyan civil war.

349th Sqn was the first operational F-16 squadron in NATO.

References

Bibliography
 Donnet, Mike and Leon Branders. Ils en Etaient !. Brussels, Belgium: Pierre De Meyere, Editeur, 1979.
 Halley, James J. The Squadrons of the Royal Air Force & Commonwealth, 1918-1988. Tonbridge, Kent, UK: Air-Britain (Historians) Ltd., 1988. .
 Jefford, C.G. RAF Squadrons, a Comprehensive Record of the Movement and Equipment of all RAF Squadrons and their Antecedents since 1912. Shrewsbury, Shropshire, UK: Airlife Publishing, 2001. .
 Lallemant, Lt. Colonel R.A. Rendez-vous avec la chance (in French). Paris: Robert Laffont, 1962.
 Rawlings, John D.R. Fighter Squadrons of the RAF and their Aircraft. London: Macdonald and Jane's (Publishers) Ltd., 1969 (new revised edition 1976, reprinted 1978). .

External links

349 Squadron History at raf.mod.uk
 History of No.'s 330–352 Squadrons at RAF Web

Fighter Squadron, 349
349
349
Military units and formations established in 1942
Military units and formations disestablished in 1943
Military units and formations established in 1943
Military units and formations disestablished in 1946
Military units and formations established in 1946